Canalobre Cave is a karst cave located in the small municipality of Busot, Alicante Province, in the Valencian Community of Spain. It has an estimated area of at least . It is one of the largest and one of the most popular caves in the Valencian Community.

The cave is known for a large vault of  height similar in shape to a cathedral. The cave contains a wide variety of speleothems, including stalactites, coralloids, stalagmites, flowstones, draperies, columns, helictites, gours, spars, crusts and flowers. Most are formed of calcite, though some in the lower areas are sulfate-based.

Researchers have studied several aspects in the caves, including its microclimate and drip water.

References

External links 

 
 The Caves of Canalobre, mariblanca.co.uk

Geography of the Province of Alicante
Show caves in Spain
Tourist attractions in the Valencian Community
Caves of Spain